Yekaterina Pyatkina (born 18 June 1990) is a Kazakhstani footballer who plays as a midfielder. She has been a member of the Kazakhstan women's national team.

References

1990 births
Living people
Women's association football midfielders
Kazakhstani women's footballers
Kazakhstan women's international footballers